Scheffler is a German surname:

 Axel Scheffler (born 1957), German book illustrator
 Christoph Thomas Scheffler (1699–1756) Painter of the rococo period, famous mostly for his frescoes
 Erna Scheffler (1893–1983), German senior judge
 Felix Scheffler (1915–1986), German World War II Wehrmacht veteran and later chief of East German People's Navy
 Herb Scheffler (1917–2001), American professional basketball player
 Israel Scheffler (1923–2014), philosopher of science and of education
 János Scheffler (1887–1952), bishop of Romania and Hungary
 Johann(es) Scheffler, also called Angelus Silesius, (1624–1677), mystic and physician
 Scottie Scheffler (born 1996), American golfer
 Steve Scheffler (born 1967), American professional basketball player
 Ted Scheffler (1864–1949), American Major League Baseball outfielder
 Tom Scheffler (born 1954), American professional basketball player
 Tony Scheffler (born 1983), American football tight end
 Wolfgang Scheffler (historian) (1929–2008), professor of Political Science and History at the Free University of Berlin
 Wolfgang Scheffler (inventor) (born 1956), Austrian inventor of flexible reflector to concentrate sunlight for solar cooking, etc.

See also 
 2485 Scheffler
 Scheffler Palace
 Scheffler's owlet

 Related surnames
 Scheffel

German-language surnames